PP-3 Attock-III is a Constituency of Provincial Assembly of Punjab.

General elections 2018 
In 2018 Pakistani general election, Tahir Sadiq a ticket holder of PTI won PP-3 Attock III election by taking 62,337 votes.

General elections 2013

General elections 2008

See also
 PP-4 Attock-IV
 PP-5 Attock-V

References

External links
 Election commission Pakistan's official website
 Awazoday.com check result
 Official Website of Government of Punjab

Provincial constituencies of Punjab, Pakistan